Kungsholm (Swedish language for "King's Island") may refer to any of these passenger ships:

, an ocean liner operated by the Swedish American Line 1923–1924
, an ocean liner operated by the Swedish American Line 1928–1942
, a combined ocean liner/cruise ship operated by the Swedish American Line 1953–1965
, a combined ocean liner/cruise ship operated by the Swedish American Line 1966–1975 and Flagship Cruises 1975–1978

Ship names